Stefan Szczesny (born 9 April 1951) is a German painter, draughtsman, and sculptor.
He is best known for co-founding the Neue Wilde movement in the early 1980s.

Biography

1951–1994 

Stefan Szczesny was born in Munich as the son of the philosopher and publisher Gerhard Szczesny and his wife Martha Meuffel, a theatre producer. Upon attending primary and secondary schools in Munich, he acquired his first training as a painter at a private art school in Munich (1967–69). From 1969 to 1975, he studied at the Academy of Fine Arts in Munich. His mentor there was the abstract painter Günter Fruhtrunk. During this time, he also attended lectures in art history and philosophy at Ludwig Maximilian University and worked as a freelance art critic.

Under the influence of his mentor Fruhtrunk Szczesny experimented in these years with abstract and minimalist art. A major turn-about occurred in 1975–76, when Szczesny was in Paris on a scholarship of the German Academic Exchange Service. The encounter there with the paintings of Delacroix caused Szczesny to rethink abstract and minimalist tenets and to return, eventually, to figuration.

The break was not immediate: in 1979, for instance, he exhibited relatively abstract paintings at the Kunstforum of the Städtische Galerie im Lenbachhaus; many of the works created during a stay at the Villa Romana in Florence in 1980, too, display abstract features. Nonetheless, it was as a figurative painter that Szczesny eventually gained wide public attention, in particular as the organiser of, and participant in, the 1981 exhibition Rundschau Deutschland. Rundschau Deutschland brought together works of a number of young German-speaking figurative painters who later came to be known as the Neue Wilde.

Szczesny was one of the protagonists of the Neue Wilde.  In 1982, he participated in a number of "Neue Wilde"-related exhibitions, such as "5 aus Köln" ("5 from Cologne", with Walter Dahn, Jiri Dokoupil, Gerhard Kever and Andreas Schulze) and "Die neue Künstlergruppe Die wilde Malerei" ("The new group of painters: Wild painting"), both in Cologne. From 1984 to 1988, he edited the journal "Malerei. Peinture. Painting", which offered an important forum for the new figurative painters.

More than other Neue Wilde painters, however, Szczesny was (and still is) interested in art historical tradition. In a 1985 interview, for instance, Szczesny remarked: "If Cézanne paints Bathers, whom Titian, Delacroix and Courbet had painted before, and Renoir paints them and Picasso paints them again, and Matisse paints them again, then Szczesny, too, paints them again!" It is in line with this declaration that in 1982/83, the year after the Neue Wilden explosion, Szczesny – in Rome at the time, as the recipient of the Rome Prize of the Prussian Academy of Arts – turned his attention to the roots of European art. He created a series of "Roman paintings" exploring the world of Greco-Roman myth. Similarly, in 1984 he created a number of paintings focusing on the (Ovidian) theme of metamorphosis; these were exhibited in one of Szczesny's largest early exhibitions, alongside ancient sculpture at the Glyptothek and Staatliche Antikensammlung in Munich.

The first comprehensive retrospective of Szczesny's work followed in 1988, curated by Klaus Honneff at the Rheinisches Landesmuseum in Bonn.

In late 80s and early 90s, Szczesny's work was shown in many exhibitions. The artist, during these years, discovered his love of the Caribbean, evinced for instance in his Jamaica paintings of 1990. But Szczesny was engaged in other projects, too. For instance, he painted a series of portraits of personal "culture heroes", from Bach to James Joyce, Marcel Proust, Glenn Gould and Jimi Hendrix. He also created comprehensive stage designs (e.g. for Gert Pfafferodt's production of Schiller's "Kabale und Liebe").

1994–2001 

In 1994, Szczesny relocated to New York, setting up his studio at 12 Warren Street. The exposure to the New York art scene (post Andy Warhol) had an important effect on the artist. He began better to understand art as a professional business. One of the results was the founding, in 1996, of the "Szczesny Factory". The Factory is modelled on the large-scale workshops of the Italian Renaissance and Warhol's Factory. It has since allowed him wide-ranging activities, including book publications, architectural projects and collaborations with fashion labels (such as Escada).

Two major art projects implemented during these years (and in the Szczesny Factory framework) were the "Kempinski Art Project" in 1998, which involved the comprehensive artistic design of the Kempinski Hotel Bahia in Estepona/Marbella; and the "Living Planet" art project at the Expo 2000 in Hanover, which involved the creation of twelve painted murals, with dimensions of H 300 x W 830 cm each, depicting a map of life and suggesting the importance of protecting endangered species.

In the mid-90s, Szczesny also began visiting the island of Mustique. He has travelled there regularly since and has created a number of Mustique-inspired paintings. His relation to Mustique is documented in his book on Mustique (2002).

2001–2010 

In 2001, Szczesy moved to Saint-Tropez in South France. In view of Szczesny's love of nature and the Mediterranean. In taking it, he also continued the tradition of painters such as Paul Signac or Henri Matisse who had lived and worked in Saint-Tropez.

In 2001/02, Szczesy spent some time in a studio in Seville, Spain, where he created a number of Flamenco-inspired artworks. In 2002, a film documenting his achievements ("Szczesny – The film", directed by the Austro-American director Curt Faudon) was presented at the 55th Cannes Film Festival. In 2005, Szczesny began producing his so-called "shadow sculptures", cut from black steel plates and depicting lush vegetation and sensual female figures as symbols of life. In 2007, the exhibition "Mainau – The dream of an earthly paradise" offered a comprehensive overview of Szczesny's wide-ranging artistic output. On the occasion, Szczesny transformed Mainau island into a total work of art, creating a large number of ceramics in various shapes and sizes, large glass stelae and many other objects, including a bridge and a painted zeppelin NT. In 2008, Szczesny began work on a series of "golden paintings"; in these, Szczesny uses the powerful symbol that is gold and its associations with bounty and glory to celebrate life's beauty. In 2010, Szczesny opened his large new studio in Saint-Tropez.

2011–present 

In 2011, Szczesny began to collaborate with the car company Jaguar, as the company's brand ambassador. The collaboration has allowed the artist to realise major art projects. In 2011, Jaguar presented an exhibition of Szczesny's shadow sculptures in St. Moritz, on Sylt and in Saint-Tropez. In 2012, around a large number of sculptures, ceramics and paintings were shown in Frankfurt (and in particular in Frankfurt's Palmengarten).

In 2014, a retrospective of the work of Stefan Szczesny is hosted at the Palais des Papes in Avignon.

In 2017 the Citadelle de Saint-Tropez hosted a comprehensive sculpture retrospective 2005–2017 by Stefan Szczesny.

Exhibitions

Single exhibitions (selection) 
 1976 Goethe-Institut, Paris, France 
 1979 "Seven Paintings", Städtische Galerie im Lenbachhaus, Kunstforum München, Munich, Germany
 1980 "Perspektiven '80", Art II, Basel, Switzerland
 1981 "Works on paper 1977–81", Galerie Friedrich and Knust, Munich, Germany 
 1983 "Immagini Romane", Villa Massimo, Rome, Italy
 1984 "Metamorphoses", Glyptothek und Staatliche Antikensammlung, Munich, Germany
 1985 "Paintings and works on paper", Kunstverein Pforzheim, Reuchlinhaus, Germany 
 1988 "Szczesny 1978–1987", Rheinisches Landesmuseum, Bonn, Germany 
 1989 "Works on paper", Goethe Institut, Madrid, Spain
 1990 "Paintings and works on paper 1969–1989", Kunstverein Mannheim, Germany 
 1991 "Portraits (Idols – Myths – Models)", Kunstverein Heidelberg, Germany 
 1992 "L’annunziazione della Pittura", Arte Contemporanea Hirmer & Museo Comunale, Greve/Chianti, Italy
 1992 "Portraits", Kunsthalle Bremen, Germany 
 1993 "Caribbean Style", Neue Galerie der Stadt Linz, Austria (later at Lok Gallery, New York) 
 1994 "Portraits", Nikki Diana Marquardt Gallery, Paris, France
 1994 "Portraits of Musicians", Kölner Philharmonie, Cologne, Germany 
 1996 "Eva dancing with the mirror", Fassbender Fine Art, Chicago, USA 
 1997 "Szczesny, 1975–1996", Haus am Lützowplatz, Berlin, Germany 
 1997 Ceramics, Badisches Landesmuseum, Karlsruhe, Germany 
 1997 Paintings and ceramics, Gerhard-Marcks-Haus, Bremen, Germany 
 1998 „Szczesny – Côte d’Azur", Kunsthalle Emden, Germany 
 1998 "La joie de vivre", Museo del Grabado Español Contemporáneo, Marbella, Spain 
 1999 "Côte d‘Azur", Museum Moderner Kunst, Wörlen – Passau, Germany 
 1999 "Painting meets photography", Fondazione Levi, Venice, Italy 
 1999 "Szczesny. Côte d'Azur", Espace Bonnard, Le Cannet/Cannes, France
 2000 "The Living Planet", Expo 2000, Hanover, Germany 
2001 "Luxe, calme et volupté ... ou la joie de vivre", Centre d’art La Malmaison, Cannes, France
 2003 "A feast for the eyes", Gustav-Lübcke-Museum, Hamm, Germany 
 2004 "Mediterráneo – La Estética del Sur", Ses Voltes–Centre d’Exposicions, Palma de Mallorca, Spain
 2005 "Images érotiques", Kunsthalle Mannheim, Germany 
 2007 „The dream of an earthly paradise", Insel Mainau, Germany 
 2007 Painting on photography & sculptures, Villa Aurélienne, Fréjus, France 
 2008 Ceramic sculptures, Villa Domergue, Cannes, France
 2010 "Szczesny diary: St. Tropez, New York, Mustique", 532 Gallery Thomas Jaeckel, New York, USA 
 2011 Shadow sculptures in Saint-Tropez, Ville de Saint-Tropez, France
 2011 Sculptures and paintings, Kunsthalle Worpswede, Germany 
 2011 Sculptures and paintings, Künstlerhaus am Lenbachplatz, Munich, Germany 
 2012 "Szczesny in Frankfurt" & "Kunstgarten Palmengarten", Stadt Frankfurt und Palmengarten Frankfurt, Germany 
 2013 "Blühende Welten", Schloss Sigmaringen, Sigmaringen, Germany 
 2014 "Métamorphoses méditerranéennes", Retrospective, Palais des papes, Avignon, France
 2017 „Sculptures 2005–2017“, Retrospective, Citadelle, Saint-Tropez
2019 "Szczesny aux Baux-de-Provence", Les Baux-de-Provence

Group exhibitions (selection) 
 1976 "Les Grands et les Jeunes", Petit Palais, Paris, France 
 1980 Jürgen Ponto Foundation, Frankfurt am Main, Germany 
 1980 XIIth Festival International de la Peinture, Cagnes-sur-Mer, France
 1980 "Art and critics", Kunstverein München, Munich, Germany 
 1981 "Rundschau Deutschland", Cologne and Munich, Germany 
 1982 "5 aus Köln" (mit Walter Dahn, Jiri Georg Dokoupil, Gerard Kever und Andreas Schulze), Six Friedrich Galerie, Munich, Germany 
 1982 "Die neue Künstergruppe: Wilde Malerei" (mit Anzinger, Dahn, Dokoupil), Im Klapperhof, Cologne, Germany 
 1982 "Variationen und Sequenzen", Kunstmuseum Düsseldorf, Germany 
 1984 "Zwischenergebnis: Neue Deutsche Malerei", Neue Galerie am Landesmuseum Johanneum Graz, Austria 
 1987 "Skulpturen von Malern", Kunstverein Mannheim, Mannheim, Germany 
 1987 "Beelden van Schilders", Museum van Bommel van Dam, Venlo, Netherlands 
 1987 "Made in Cologne", DuMont Kunsthalle, Cologne, Germany 
 1987 "A Propos de dessin" (with Allington, Fletcher, Kounellis et al. ), Maeght Gallery, Paris, France 
 1991 "A Dialogue of Images", Contemporary American and German Painting, Galerie Pfefferle, Munich, Germany 
 1991 "Artists support Roma", Anzinger, Dahn, Dokoupil, Kasseböhmer, Szczesny, Trockel, Kunststation St. Peter, Cologne, Germany 
 1998 Venezia Aperto Vetro – International New Glass, 16. Oktober, Venice, Italy
 1998 "Elvira Bach & Stefan Szczesny", Vetri e Dipinti – Paintings und Glas Sculptures, Galeria Luchetta, Murano (Venedig) 
 1998 "CologneKunst", Kunsthalle Köln, Cologne, Germany 
 2000 "Il Paradiso", Neue Galerie der Stadt Linz, Linz, Austria
 2000 "De la couleur et du feu", Céramiques d‘artistes de 1885 à nos jours, Musée de la Faïence, Château Pastré, Marseille, France 
 2002 "paper art 8: Turbulences in Paper", Leopold Hoesch Museum, Düren, Germany 
 2007 Art Seasons Cape Town, 4.2 -4.3, Cape Town, South Africa
 2010 „Stilleben", Stefan Szczesny and Elvira Bach, Galerie Voigt, Nuremberg, Germany 
 2014 "De l’expressivité primitive au regard inspiré", Centre d’art La Malmaison, Cannes, France

Bibliography

Publications by Stefan Szczesny (selection) 
 (ed.) Malerei. Painting. Peinture (Art journal), Edition Pfefferle, 1984–88
 (ed.) Maler über Malerei, DuMont, Cologne 1989

Publications about Stefan Szczesny (selection) 
 1981: Doris Schmidt, "Die zornigen Dreißigjährigen" (about Rundschau Deutschland), Süddeutsche Zeitung, 14/15 March 1981
 1981: Helmut Schneider, "Pubertierende Malerei" (about Rundschau Deutschland), Die Zeit, 20 March 1981
 1981: Wolfgang Max Faust, "'Du hast keine Chance. Nutze Sie!' With it and against it. Tendencies in recent German art", in Artforum International, September 1981
 1984: Stephan Schmidt-Wulffen, "Erotisches Spiel mit dem Schattenmann", art 8/1984
 1985: Hanns Theodor Flemming, "Szczesny: Badende", Weltkunst 12 (Juni 1985)
 1992: Donald Kuspit, "Stefan Szczesny – DuMont Hall", Artforum 11/1992
 1995: Marie-Luise Syring, "La peinture au tournant", artpress spécial No. 16
 1997: Peter Schmitt, "Stefan Szczesny – Gefäße und Skulpturen", Neue Keramik 11/1997
 2005: Ruth Händler, "Den Blumenstrauß malen", Handelsblatt 25–27 February 2005
 2014: Patrick Le Fur, "Stefan Szczesny – La joie de vivre et de créer", Art Passion No. 38

Books and exhibition catalogues (selection) 
 1988: Klaus Honnef et al. (ed.), Stefan Szczesny. Bilder 1978–1987, Rheinland Verlag, Cologne, 
 1991: Wilfried Dickhoff (ed.), Szczesny. Portraits 1989–1991. Idole – Mythen – Leitbilder, Harenberg Verlag, 
 1995: Donald Kuspit, Szczesny. DuMont Kunstbuchverlag, Cologne 1995, 
 1997: Szczesny. Skulpturen und Keramik, exhibition catalogue, Gerhard Marcks-Haus, Bremen, 
 1998: Achim Sommer (ed.) Szczesny. Côte d'Azur, exhibition catalogue, Kunsthalle Emden, Cantz Verlag, Ostfildern
 2000: Szczesny, The Living Planet, WWF/Expo 2000, Szczesny Factory, Cologne, 
 2001: Frédéric Ballester (ed.), Szczesny. Luxe, calme et volupté ... ou la joie de vivre, exhibition catalogue, Centre d'art La Malmaison, Cannes
 2002: Szczesny. Mustique, teNeues Verlag, Kempen, 
 2004: Szczesny. Catalogue raisonné of prints, 1981–2003, Szczesny Factory & Publishing GmbH Berlin, Berlin, 
 2005: Rolf Lauter (ed.), Szczesny. Images érotiques, Edition Braus im Wachter Verlag, Cologne, 
 2007: Andreas Lück (ed.), Szczesny Insel Mainau. Ein Traum vom irdischen Paradies, Prestel Verlag, Munich, 
 2009: Andreas Lück (ed.), Szczesny. Saint-Tropez, Szczesny Factory & Publishing GmbH Berlin, Berlin, 
 2011: Frédéric Ballester, Szczesny. Méditerranée. L'esprit du sud, Szczesny Factory & Publishing & Gallery GmbH Berlin, Berlin, 2011, 
 2012: Donald Kuspit, Szczesny: Neue Wilden works from the 80s. Szczesny Factory & Publishing GmbH Berlin, Berlin, 
 2014: Szczesny. Métamorphoses méditerranénnes, exhibition catalogue, Palais des Papes, Avignon, Szczesny Factory & Publishing GmbH Berlin, Berlin, 
 2015: Szczesny. Best of Saint-Tropez, Szczesny Factory & Publishing GmbH Berlin, Berlin,

References

External links 

 
 http://www.szczesnyfactory.com

1951 births
20th-century German painters
20th-century German male artists
German male painters
21st-century German painters
21st-century German male artists
Academy of Fine Arts, Munich alumni
German sculptors
German male sculptors
Living people
Modern painters
20th-century sculptors